There is a body of feature films, mainly live-action, featuring powered exoskeletons. Popular Mechanics said the growth of visual effects at the start of the 21st century allowed for such exoskeletons to be featured more prominently in live-action films. LiveScience said in 2013 that it was fairly common to see powered exoskeletons in films and that it helped educate the public about potential real-life use.

List of films

See also
List of films featuring mechas

Notes

References

Lists of films by common content
Films powered exoskeletons